Ádám Szögi (born 12 February 1990) is a Hungarian professional basketball player for Jászberényi KSE from the Nemzeti Bajnokság I/A. He was not chosen as the conclusion of the 2012 NBA Draft, leading to the continuation of his playing career in Europe. Szögi is generally seen at the point guard position when on the court, with height of just 1.76 meters. He has previously competed for Bodrogi Bau Vhely, Szolnoki Olaj, and Szolnoki Fõiskola.

References 

1990 births
Living people
Hungarian men's basketball players
Point guards